The second season of Hawthorne, premiered on TNT on June 22, 2010. The season contains 10 episodes and concluded airing on August 24, 2010.

Season synopsis 
In season two, we discover that Richmond Trinity is closing its doors due to financial ruin. Christina turns down a position to run a private dialysis clinic to become Director of Nursing at James River Hospital, the last hospital in that area and one that is facing closure due to its low quality of care. While originally taking this position under the assumption that she would replace the existing director, we learn that she must split the responsibilities with a head strong, difficult and emotionally burned out nurse who has no intention of working with her and resents her newly appointed position. At the end of season two Christina discovers she is pregnant with Tom's child.

Cast

Main cast 
 Jada Pinkett Smith as Christina Hawthorne, Co. Director of Nursing
 Michael Vartan as Dr. Tom Wakefield, Chief of Surgery
 David Julian Hirsh as Nurse Ray Stein
 Suleka Mathew as Nurse Bobbie Jackson
 Christina Moore as Charge Nurse Candy Sullivan of ICU
 Hannah Hodson as Camille Hawthorne
 Vanessa Lengies as Charge Nurse Kelly Epson of Pediatrics

Recurring cast 
 Anne Ramsay as Dr. Brenda Marshall
 Vanessa Bell Calloway as Gail Strummer, Co. Director of Nursing
 Adam Rayner as Steve Shaw
 James Morrison as John Morrissey, CEO of James River
 Abigail Spencer as Dr. Erin Jameson, Medical Director
 Collins Pennie as Marcus Leeds, ER Clerk
 Kenneth Choi as Paul Hyun, Chief of Surgery
 Aisha Hinds as Isabel Walsh
 Robin Weigert as Sara Adams
 Sara Gilbert as Malia Price

Production 
Masius will continue on as executive producer in the second season. In September 2009, Glen Mazzara was named showrunner for the program's second season. Masius decided to name Mazzara as showrunner for the second season, citing a desire to focus more on writing. Pinkett Smith hopes to cast her nine-year-old daughter Willow as a character in the show's second season.

Episodes

References 

2010 American television seasons